The Hellion is a 1919 American silent drama film directed by George L. Cox and starring Margarita Fischer and Emory Johnson.

Plot

Cast
{| 
! style="width: 180px; text-align: left;" |  Actor
! style="width: 230px; text-align: left;" |  Role
|- style="text-align: left;"
|Margarita Fischer||Mazie Del Mar / Blanche Harper
|-
|Emory Johnson||George Graham
|-
|Charles Spere||Larry Lawson
|-
|Henry A. Barrows||Joseph Harper
|-
|Lillian Langdon||Helen Harper
|-
|George Periolat||Signor Enrico
|-
|Frank Clark||Undetermined Role
|-
|Bull Montana||Undetermined Role
|-
|}

References

External links

American silent feature films
American black-and-white films
1910s English-language films
Silent American drama films
Films directed by George L. Cox
1910s American films